Jack Montrose (December 30, 1928 – February 7, 2006) was a jazz tenor saxophonist and arranger. After attending college in Los Angeles, he worked with Jerry Gray and then Art Pepper. Montrose also did arrangements for Clifford Brown. He became known for cool jazz and/or West coast jazz.

Montrose was born in Detroit. Beginning in the mid-1950s Montrose's heroin addiction became a liability and by the time he had overcome it his style of jazz was no longer popular. This led him to play in strip joints for a time until he relocated to Las Vegas where he worked in casinos. Montrose returned to recording in 1977 and in 1986 had some success in collaboration with Pete Jolly.

Jack Montrose (West Coast Jack) is not to be confused with tenorist J.R. Monterose (East Coast Jake) who played on Charles Mingus's album Pithecanthropus Erectus.

He died in Las Vegas.

Discography

As leader
Arranged by Montrose (Pacific Jazz, 1954) with Bob Gordon Quartet / Clifford Brown Ensemble
Arranged/Played/Composed by Jack Montrose (Atlantic, 1955) with Bob Gordon
Jack Montrose Sextet (Pacific Jazz, 1955)
Blues and Vanilla (RCA Victor, 1956) with Red Norvo
The Horn's Full (RCA Victor, 1957)
Spread a Little Joy (Slingshot, 1987) - The Jack Montrose & Pete Jolly Quartet
Live at Capozzoli's (Hindsight, 1999) - The Jack Montrose Quintet with Ron Stout, Ross Tompkins, Richard Simon, Paul Kreibich

As sideman
With Chet Baker
Grey December (Pacific Jazz, 1953 [1992])
The Trumpet Artistry of Chet Baker (Pacific Jazz, 1953–54)
Chet Baker & Strings (Pacific Jazz, 1954) - as arranger
With Elmer Bernstein
"The Man with the Golden Arm" (Decca, 1956)
With Frank Butler
The Stepper (Xanadu, 1977)
With Shelly Manne
Concerto for Clarinet & Combo (Contemporary, 1957)
With Art Pepper
Surf Ride (Savoy, 1952-1954 [1956])
With Shorty Rogers
Shorty Rogers Plays Richard Rodgers (RCA Victor, 1957)
Portrait of Shorty (RCA Victor, 1957)
With Mel Torme
Mel Torme Sings Fred Astaire  (Bethlehem, 1956)

References

1928 births
2006 deaths
Musicians from Detroit
Cool jazz saxophonists
Cool jazz arrangers
Jazz tenor saxophonists
American music arrangers
20th-century American saxophonists
Jazz musicians from Michigan
American jazz saxophonists

ja:J.R.モンテローズ